Linda Kaye Henning is an American actress and singer most notable for starring in the 1960s sitcom Petticoat Junction.

Career
Henning began to focus on acting in her late teens. Her career began in 1953. Her earliest acting roles include Rebel Without a Cause, Bus Stop and Gidget. She was cast as a dancer in the Columbia Pictures film Bye Bye Birdie (1963). She appeared in numerous musicals, including High Button Shoes, Brigadoon and The Sound of Music.

Henning made many TV appearances from the 1960s through the 1980s on a variety of programs, including The Ed Sullivan Show, Adam-12, Happy Days, Mork & Mindy, The Facts of Life and The Tonight Show. She provided the voice of Jethrine Bodine in The Beverly Hillbillies. She made dramatic appearances in Hunter and Capitol and in Sliders as Mrs. Mallory. Her many game show appearances include Family Feud, Match Game, Hollywood Squares, The Perfect Match, Three for the Money, Password, Tattletales, Showoffs, Password Plus and Body Language. She was a substitute hostess on the 1974–1976 daytime edition of High Rollers.

Henning's most notable role was as Betty Jo Bradley in the CBS series Petticoat Junction, which ran from 1963 until 1970. She was only one of three cast members, along with Edgar Buchanan and Frank Cady, to remain throughout the show's entire run and appeared in all but three of the 222 episodes (the exceptions being the season one episodes "Bobbie Jo and The Beatnik" "Cannonball Christmas" (Linda provided a voice over for a brief scene involving a stand-in for Betty Jo atop the train but in a glaring error also used was a previous episode's (Quick, Hide the Railroad) footage of Linda singing with Pat and Jeannine but dubbed over with a Christmas song) and the season two episode "Have Library, Will Travel". She was billed for the first five seasons of the series as Linda Kaye. From season six (fall 1968) until the show was cancelled, she was billed by her full name. In some episodes in later years, Henning and her television sisters (played by Meredith MacRae and Lori Saunders) sang in a trio, and she often sang duets with co-star Mike Minor, who played Steve Elliott.

Personal life
Henning was born in Los Angeles to television producer Paul Henning and his wife, Ruth.

In 1968, a year after Henning's screen marriage to Mike Minor's character in Petticoat Junction, the couple married in real life. They divorced in 1973. She married actor Leon Ashby Adams in 1994.

References

External links

Living people
American television actresses
American musical theatre actresses
American women singers
American contraltos
Actresses from Los Angeles
Year of birth missing (living people)
21st-century American women